Ascaloptynx is a genus of owlflies in the family Ascalaphidae. There are at least two described species in Ascaloptynx.

Species
These two species belong to the genus Ascaloptynx:
 Ascaloptynx appendiculata (Fabricius, 1793)
 Ascaloptynx oligocenica Nel, 1991

References

Further reading

 
 

Ascalaphidae
Articles created by Qbugbot